Unity is a census-designated place (CDP) in the town of Unity in Waldo County, Maine, United States. The population was 486 at the 2000 census.

Geography
Unity is located at  (44.619003, −69.336696).

According to the United States Census Bureau, the CDP has a total area of 1.8 square miles (4.7 km), all land.

Demographics

As of the census of 2000, there were 486 people, 244 households, and 112 families residing in the CDP. The racial makeup of the CDP was 96.91% White, 0.21% Black or African American, 0.82% Native American, and 2.06% from two or more races. Hispanic or Latino of any race were 1.03% of the population.

There were 244 households, out of which 23.8% had children under the age of 18 living with them, 29.9% were married couples living together, 13.1% had a female householder with no husband present, and 53.7% were non-families. 42.6% of all households were made up of individuals, and 23.4% had someone living alone who was 65 years of age or older. The average household size was 1.99 and the average family size was 2.74.

In the CDP, the population was spread out, with 21.6% under the age of 18, 15.0% from 18 to 24, 21.8% from 25 to 44, 18.9% from 45 to 64, and 22.6% who were 65 years of age or older. The median age was 36 years. For every 100 females, there were 77.4 males. For every 100 females age 18 and over, there were 78.0 males.

The median income for a household in the CDP was $18,333, and the median income for a family was $30,417. Males had a median income of $29,250 versus $23,182 for females. The per capita income for the CDP was $15,043. About 29.3% of families and 33.1% of the population were below the poverty line, including 32.4% of those under age 18 and 25.2% of those age 65 or over.

References

Census-designated places in Maine
Census-designated places in Waldo County, Maine